"Autopsy" is the second episode of the second season of House, which premiered on the Fox network on September 20, 2005. Andie, a nine-year-old terminal cancer patient, experiences hallucinations, leading House and his team to conduct an autopsy on a live patient.

Plot
House and his team struggle to find the cause of hallucinations that Andie (Sasha Pieterse) is seeing. She is a nine-year-old girl with terminal cancer (alveolar rhabdomyosarcoma), but tests reveal that her cancer is in remission, meaning that the hallucinations are unrelated to her cancer. Meanwhile, House questions Andie's motives for her bravery, suggesting it may itself be a symptom of a problem in her amygdala.
House discovers a benign tumor in her heart, which is surgically removed, but it does not account for the hallucinations. House deduces that there must be a clot which the cancer deployed prior to removal. He suggests employing therapeutic hypothermia to discover the clot, which does not show on an angiograph: Cooling her body temperature down to 21° Celsius will stop her heart, effectively making her clinically dead.  Then the doctors will remove 2-3 liters of blood and discover the clot when the blood is pumped back in. House compares this procedure to "performing an autopsy on a living person."
The blood removal and temperature can not be held for more than 60 seconds or she will suffer permanent damage. Wilson calls it a "lottery shot," but finding the clot will give her an additional year to live. In a tense moment Foreman finds the clot, which only appeared for a fraction of a second, and with his direction the surgery is successful. Andie tells Chase that she went to a cancer camp and has never kissed a boy in her life and she doesn't know if she will be walking out of the hospital. She asks Chase to kiss her. He is hesitant at first and says no but she keeps begging him to do it. Finally he kisses her and later he tells the team and House. They are surprised. 
Wilson confronts House about the placement of the blood clot – it was not in her amygdala. House concedes he was wrong about Andie's bravery being a symptom of her clot, but replies to Wilson saying the girl is dead anyway. Wilson states that Andie could outlive him. When Andie is leaving the hospital she hugs each of the staff, finally reaching House, who stands and looks awkward as she hugs him. Andie tells House, "It's sunny outside, you should go for a walk."
As House is leaving the hospital he stands and admires some motorcycles. He asks the salesman if he can take one for a test ride. The episode ends with House riding the motorcycle down a long stretch of empty road.

Clinic patient 
House sees Brad (Randall Park), a clinic patient who managed to mutilate himself trying to remove his own foreskin with a box cutter knife, in an attempt to please his new girlfriend. House refers him to a plastic surgeon.

Reception

Accolades 
Lawrence Kaplow won the 2006 Writers Guild of America award for Episodic Drama for this episode. The episode won a Golden Reel Award for Outstanding Achievement in Sound Editing for Dialogue and ADR in Episodic Short Form Broadcast Media. Danielle Berdman and Derek Hill received an Emmy nomination for Outstanding Art Direction for a Single-Camera Series.

References

External links 

 "Autopsy" at Fox.com
 

House (season 2) episodes
2005 American television episodes

it:Episodi di Dr. House - Medical Division (seconda stagione)#Il coraggio di morire